Oplegnathus is currently the sole recognized genus in the knifejaw family (Oplegnathidae) of marine perciform fishes.  The largest, the Cape knifejaw, can reach a maximum length around 90 cm (35 in).  Knifejaws have teeth fused into a parrot-like beak in adulthood.  They feed on barnacles and mollusks, and are fished commercially.  They are native to the Indian and Pacific Oceans.

Species
The currently recognized species in this genus are:
 Oplegnathus conwayi J. Richardson, 1840, 1840 (Cape knifejaw)
 Oplegnathus fasciatus (Temminck & Schlegel, 1844) (striped beakfish or barred knifejaw)
 Oplegnathus insignis (Kner, 1867) (Pacific beakfish)
 Oplegnathus peaolopesi J. L. B. Smith, 1947 (Mozambique knifejaw)
 Oplegnathus punctatus (Temminck & Schlegel, 1844) (spotted knifejaw)
 Oplegnathus robinsoni Regan, 1916 (Natal knifejaw)
 Oplegnathus woodwardi Waite, 1900 (knifejaw)

Timeline

References

Extant Miocene first appearances